The Priority Development Assistance Fund scam, also called the PDAF scam or the pork barrel scam, is a political scandal involving the alleged misuse by several members of the Congress of the Philippines of their Priority Development Assistance Fund (PDAF, popularly called "pork barrel"), a lump-sum discretionary fund granted to each member of Congress for spending on priority development projects of the Philippine government, mostly on the national level.

The scam was first exposed in the Philippine Daily Inquirer by Nancy C. Carvajal on July 12, 2013, with the six-part exposé of Carvajal pointing to businesswoman Janet Lim-Napoles as the scam's mastermind after Benhur K. Luy, her second cousin and former personal assistant, was rescued by agents of the National Bureau of Investigation (NBI) on March 22, 2013, four months after he was detained by Napoles at her unit at the Pacific Plaza Towers in Bonifacio Global City. Initially centering on Napoles' involvement in the 2004 Fertilizer Fund scam, the government investigation on Luy's testimony has since expanded to cover Napoles' involvement in a wider scam involving the misuse of PDAF funds from the 2000s to 2013.

It is estimated that the Philippine government was defrauded of some ₱10 billion in the course of the scam, having been diverted to Napoles, participating members of Congress and other government officials,Including 23 senators who managed to steal approximately 10 billion pesos aside from the PDAF and the fertilizer fund maintained by the Department of Agriculture. Around ₱900 million in royalties earned from the Malampaya gas field was also lost to the scam. The scam has provoked public outrage, with calls being made on the Internet for popular protests to demand the abolition of the PDAF, and the order for Napoles' arrest sparking serious discussion online.

Background

Although the history of pork barrel-like discretionary funds in the Philippines dates back to 1922, during the American colonial period, the PDAF in its current form was established during the administration of Corazon Aquino with the creation of the Countrywide Development Fund (CDF) in 1990. With ₱2.3 billion in initial funding, the CDF was designed to allow legislators to fund small-scale infrastructure or community projects which fell outside the scope of the national infrastructure program, which was often restricted to large infrastructure items. The CDF was later renamed the PDAF in 2000, during the administration of Joseph Estrada.

Since 2008, every member of the House of Representatives usually receives an annual PDAF allocation of ₱70 million, while every senator receives an annual allocation of ₱200 million. The President also benefits from a PDAF-like allocation, the President's Social Fund (PSF), worth around ₱1 billion. Contrary to public belief, however, PDAF allocations are not actually released to members of Congress. Rather, disbursements under the PDAF are coursed via implementing agencies of the Philippine government, and are limited to "soft" and "hard" projects: the former largely referring to non-infrastructure projects (such as scholarships and financial assistance programs, although small infrastructure projects are also considered "soft" projects), and the latter referring to infrastructure projects which would be coursed via the Department of Public Works and Highways.

Because presidential systems are often prone to political gridlock, the PDAF is often used as a means to generate majority legislative support for the programs of the executive. Furthermore, because PDAF allocations are released by the Department of Budget and Management (DBM), PDAF allocations are often dependent on the relationship a legislator has with the sitting president. For example, during the latter years of the Gloria Macapagal Arroyo administration, she was more generous in allocating PDAF funds in the annual national budget in order to win the favor of legislators. PDAF allocation has gradually increased over the years. For example, before Arroyo stepped down, the last PDAF allocated was for the year 2010 at ₱10.86 billion, but when the Benigno Aquino III administration passed its first budget for 2011, the allocation more than doubled to ₱24.62 billion.

The PDAF has proven to be very unpopular, with numerous calls for its abolition. In 1996, the Philippine Daily Inquirer published an exposé on systematic corruption in the CDF, with an anonymous congressman (since identified as Romeo D. Candazo of Marikina) elaborating how legislators and other government officials earned from overpricing projects in order to receive large commissions. Public outrage over the misuse of the CDF was instrumental in the enactment of reforms which led to the formation of the PDAF. The constitutionality of the PDAF has also been challenged in the Supreme Court. In 1994, the constitutionality of the CDF was challenged by the Philippine Constitution Association, arguing that the CDF's mechanisms encroach on the executive's power of implementing the budget passed by the legislature, but the Court ruled the CDF constitutional under the legislative's "power of the purse". This ruling was reaffirmed in 2001, when the PDAF was challenged again in the Supreme Court. Legislators themselves are torn on the abolition of the PDAF, with some supporting total abolition, others supporting increased regulation to minimize abuse of PDAF disbursements, and others opposed to it.

Modus operandi

The PDAF or pork barrel scam involved the funding of "ghost projects" that were funded using the PDAF funds of participating lawmakers. These projects were in turn "implemented" through Napoles' companies, with the projects producing no tangible output. According to testimony provided by Benhur Luy's brother, Arthur, funds would be processed through fake foundations and non-governmental organizations (NGOs) established under the wing of the JLN Group of Companies, the holding company of Janet Lim-Napoles, with Napoles' employees—even a nanny—named as incorporators or directors. Each foundation or NGO served as an official recipient of a particular legislator's PDAF funds, and each organization had a number of bank accounts where PDAF funds would be deposited for the implementation of these projects.

Napoles, who specialized in trading agricultural products, frequently used the procurement of agricultural inputs in the propagation of the scam. Either her employees would write to legislators requesting for funds for the implementation of a particular project (e.g. farm inputs), or a legislator would indicate to the DBM a particular recipient agency for his or her PDAF funds that would be pre-selected by Napoles. Once received, this is forwarded to the DBM, which would then issue a Special Allotment Release Order (SARO) indicating the amount deducted from the legislator's PDAF allocation, and later a Notice of Cash Allocation (NCA) given to the recipient agency. The NCA would then be deposited in one of the foundation's accounts, and the funds withdrawn in favor of the JLN Group of Companies. The funds would then be split between Napoles, the lawmaker, the official of the DA responsible for facilitating the transfer of funds and, for good measure, the local mayor or governor. The JLN Group of Companies offered a commission of 10-15% against funds released to local government units and recipient agencies of PDAF funds, while a legislator would receive a commission of between 40 and 50% against the total value of his/her PDAF.

Letters sent by Napoles' employees to participating legislators would also include a letter from a local government unit requesting for funding, bearing the forged signature of the local mayor or governor. All documents involving local government units were prepared by Napoles' staff, and Benhur Luy would forge the signature of the local mayor or governor. Local government officials who were used by Napoles were often unaware that they were participating in the scam. In other instances, however, Napoles would use emissaries to establish contact with local mayors in exchange for commissions that would come from the implementation of these projects.

Every recipient agency participating in the scam had employees or officials that maintained contact with Napoles, allowing for the smooth processing of transactions and the expedient release of PDAF funds to her organizations. Most importantly, Napoles was in regular contact with the DBM through Undersecretary for Operations Mario L. Relampagos, who had three employees (identified as Leah, Malou and Lalaine) responsible for the processing of SAROs destined for Napoles' organizations.

Accused parties

In the initial report published by the Philippine Daily Inquirer, 28 members of Congress (five senators and 23 representatives) were named as participants in the PDAF scam. Twelve of these legislators were identified by the newspaper, and close to ₱3 billion in PDAF funds coming from these legislators alone were exposed to the scam. Notably, the Inquirer named Bong Revilla, Juan Ponce Enrile, Jinggoy Estrada, Bongbong Marcos and Gregorio Honasan as the five senators who participated in the scam. Revilla was the largest contributor among the 28 legislators, with around ₱1.015 billion of his PDAF funds being transferred to organizations identified with the JLN Group of Companies, although the extent to which legislators participated in the scam varied widely.

Other legislators identified by the Inquirer as participating in the scam include La Union Representative Victor Ortega and former Representative Arthur Pingoy. Early reports had also identified Senator Loren Legarda as one of the participants in the scam, but Luy later denied her participation.

Legislators identified by the Inquirer as participants in the PDAF scam—Bong Revilla in particular—have denied their participation in the scam. All senators except Jinggoy Estrada denied any knowledge of the scheme (Estrada refused to comment), and Marcos denied being acquaintances with Janet Lim-Napoles. Revilla and Marcos have also claimed that the investigation into the scam is politically motivated, saying that Malacañang is out to discredit potential candidates for the 2016 presidential election who are not allied with President Aquino: a charge that the administration denies. However, both Revilla and Marcos, as well as Honasan, have indicated their willingness to participate in any investigation, saying that they have nothing to hide.

On August 16, 2013, the Commission on Audit released the results of a three-year investigation into the use of legislators' PDAF and other discretionary funds during the last three years of the Arroyo administration. The report not only affirmed the Inquirer s findings, but also pointed to more legislators being privy to misuse of their PDAF funds. According to the report, between 2007 and 2009, ₱6.156 billion in PDAF funds coming from 12 senators and 180 representatives were disbursed to fund 772 projects found to be implemented in ways that were "not proper and highly irregular". Of the 82 NGOs implementing those projects, ten are linked to Napoles. The report also elaborates on "questionable" transactions made using the PDAF: ₱1.054 billion went to NGOs which were either unregistered, used multiple Tax Identification Numbers (TIN), or issued questionable receipts; while ₱1.289 billion in PDAF disbursements spent were not compliant with the Government Procurement Reform Act of 2003. Lawmakers from across the political spectrum, both past and present, were cited in the report, some of whom (such as Edgardo Angara, Ruffy Biazon, Neptali Gonzales II and Niel Tupas, Jr.) are closely related to President Aquino. Some legislators also donated PDAF funds to NGOs they themselves are affiliated with: these include Angara, Victoria Sy-Alvarado and Matias Defensor, Jr.

Other government officials have been implicated as well in the PDAF scam. Agriculture Secretary Proceso Alcala, for example, was accused by Merlina Suñas, Luy's fellow whistleblower, of being complicit in the scam, as his department was responsible for transferring at least ₱16 million in PDAF funds to livelihood projects managed by an NGO linked to Napoles. 97 mayors were also implicated in the scam in connection with the allocation of Malampaya gas field royalties as reconstruction aid for areas affected by Typhoons Ondoy and Pepeng which instead went to Napoles, after it was discovered that employees of the JLN Group of Companies forged their signatures to make it appear that they were requesting for aid. 44 other mayors were likewise implicated in the scam when Napoles, through fashion designer Eddie Baddeo, reportedly facilitated requests for disbursements from the Department of Agriculture's Agricultural Competitiveness Enhancement Fund (ACEF) on behalf of their municipalities. A number of mayors have denied involvement in the scam, including three mayors from Bataan, seven from Ilocos Norte, one from Pangasinan, and one from Iloilo.

A second batch of criminal charges was filed by the National Bureau of Investigation on 33 individuals, including Bureau of Customs Commissioner Ruffy Biazon, who is the first political ally and party-mate of President Benigno Aquino III who has been charge in relation to the scam.

Another batch of names were extracted during Janet Lim-Napoles's stay in Ospital ng Makati ("Hospital of Makati" in English) for surgical removal of her ovarian cyst. Over 100 representatives, 2 Cabinet officials and more than 20 current and former senators are being investigated. Panfilo Lacson claimed he also has another list. The Philippine Daily Inquirer claims it received a hard drive containing all transactions of Napoles, Luy and other JLN Corporation agents from the accused politicians.

Investigation
A number of investigations are currently ongoing or will be organized to determine the extent of the PDAF scam. On July 16, 2013, the Office of the Ombudsman announced that it was forming a special six-person panel initially to investigate the projects bankrolled by the 23 legislators originally named in the Philippine Daily Inquirer, in parallel with the NBI investigation against Napoles. The next day, President Aquino ordered the Department of Justice (DOJ) to conduct and "extensive and fair probe" of the scam, which Napoles also asked for on July 27. Despite calls for the investigation to be made open to the public, Justice Secretary Leila de Lima refused, stating at the time that it was too early for the DOJ investigation to be made public when the NBI was still gathering data on the scam.

Members of Congress have also called for parallel investigations in both the Senate and the House of Representatives as to the extent of the scam. Despite calls by Senator Francis Escudero to have the scam investigated, the Senate initially agreed not to investigate the scam on August 5, instead opting to wait for the results of the investigations being conducted by the DOJ, the Ombudsman, the NBI and the Commission on Audit before launching its own investigation. However, following the release of the CoA report which implicated more legislators in the scam, the Senate eventually agreed to conduct its own investigation, which would be led by its Blue Ribbon Committee.

The House of Representatives, meanwhile, has refused to conduct a probe, with Speaker Feliciano Belmonte, Jr. claiming that the House investigating its own members would be "messy", instead preferring to wait for the results of the DOJ investigation. This is despite the clamor from a number of representatives, mostly from the minority bloc not allied with President Aquino, that the House should conduct its own investigation into the matter.

Following the release of the CoA report, the DOJ is expected to expand its investigation beyond the evidence originally provided by Luy and the other Napoles whistleblowers. It is also looking at forming either a joint or a parallel investigation with the Ombudsman and the NBI, although its main focus for the time being is on Napoles' involvement in the scam.

Napoles surrendered to President Benigno Aquino III at 9:37 pm on August 28. The president gave the DILG secretary Mar Roxas and PNP director Gen. Alan Purisima custody over Napoles for booking and processing.

The NBI and Justice Secretary, Leila De Lima filed the cases of plunder and malversation of public funds against businesswoman Janet Lim-Napoles, senators Ramon Revilla Jr., Juan Ponce Enrile, Jinggoy Estrada and five former representatives on September 16.

On November 19, 2013, the Supreme Court declared PDAF as unconstitutional.

Reactions
Cardinal Luis Antonio Tagle, Archbishop of Manila – During a press conference at the University of Santo Tomas, Cardinal Tagle described the scandal as part of an "intricate web of corruption", and said that it is right that the issue be investigated. He added that those involved in the scam have "lost touch with the poor" and should visit a community of informal settlers to understand the issues poor Filipinos face on a daily basis. "We have heard many other big scandals in the past but these were buried and forgotten when a new issue came up", the cardinal added.
Renato Reyes Jr., Secretary-General of BAYAN coalition – Reyes described the scandal as a "bigger test for the Department of Justice". He also said that the coalition remains doubtful if those involved in the alleged scam will be held liable, including those perceived to be allied with the Aquino administration. Reyes also accused the House of Representatives and Senate of covering up the scam and refusing to open an investigation. BAYAN also reiterated its call for the complete abolition of the PDAF.
 The Philippine Supreme Court issued on September 10, 2013, a temporary restraining order (TRO) against the release of the remaining Priority Development Assistance Funds (PDAF) of lawmakers for 2013 and Malampaya funds.

Protests

On August 26, 2013, thousands of people went to Luneta Park in protest against the pork barrel scheme. The gathering was dubbed the "Million People March". After this, a prayer vigil dubbed "EDSA Tayo" was held on September 11 at the EDSA Shrine, where around 500-700 people attended the vigil. Two days later another protest was held at Luneta where, according to police estimates, about 3,000 people participated. The organizers stated that another rally dubbed "Level Up" would be scheduled for September 21 (with a noise barrage held before the event), and another "Million People March" protest would be held in December.

See also
People's Initiative Against Pork Barrel

References

2013 in the Philippines
2014 in the Philippines
2013 scandals
2014 scandals
Political corruption in the Philippines
Crime in Metro Manila
Political scandals in the Philippines
Presidency of Benigno Aquino III
Presidency of Gloria Macapagal Arroyo